Joe Alan Robinson (born 10 August 1996) is an English footballer who plays for Newmarket Town, as a defender.

Playing career
In 2008, Robinson joined Championship side Ipswich Town at the age of 12. After rapidly progressing through the Ipswich Town youth sides since his arrival, Robinson has captained both under-18 and under-21 sides. On 28 November 2015, after some fine form in the under-21 side, Robinson was named on the bench in Ipswich Town's 3–0 away victory over Charlton Athletic, however he failed to feature. On 19 January 2016, Robinson made his senior debut in a 2–1 defeat to Portsmouth in the FA Cup, replacing Ainsley Maitland-Niles in the 89th minute.

On 22 February 2016, Robinson joined National League side Woking on a one-month loan deal until 28 March 2016. On 23 February 2016, Robinson made his Woking debut in a 3–1 away defeat against Grimsby Town, playing the full 90 minutes. On 1 April 2016, Robinson's loan spell at Woking was extended until the end of the 2015/16 campaign. However, Robinson's loan spell at Woking was cut short in mid April.

On 25 August 2016, Robinson joined National League North side Boston United on a one-month loan deal, to gain first-team experience. Two days later, Robinson made his Boston United debut in a 1–1 home draw against Kidderminster Harriers, scoring an own goal to give the visitors the lead.

On 3 March 2017, Robinson joined National League South side St Albans City on a one-month loan deal. A day later, Robinson made his St Albans debut in their 1–0 home defeat against Bishop's Stortford, featuring for the entire 90 minutes. Robinson went onto feature in five more games for St Albans before returning to Ipswich at the end of the campaign.

On 18 May 2017, it was announced that Robinson would leave Ipswich at the end of the 2016–17 campaign upon the expiry of his current deal.

Following his release from Ipswich, Robinson joined Southern League Premier Division side Bishop's Stortford. Following an impressive first season with the Blues, in which he featured in forty-four league games all season, scoring five times, Robinson signed a new one-year deal ahead of the 2018–19 campaign.

Despite signing a new one-year deal with Bishop's Stortford, Robinson opted to re-unite with his brother Ben, at Cambridge City.

On 2 January 2019, Robinson joined Southern League Premier Central side King's Lynn Town.

On 31 May 2019, after finishing the campaign with King's Lynn Town, Robinson agreed to join Newmarket Town ahead of the 2019–20 campaign. On 20 July 2020, despite signing a new one-year deal, Robinson was banned from all footballing activities for 10 months due to betting breaches.

Career statistics

References

External links

1996 births
Living people
People from Haverhill, Suffolk
English footballers
Association football defenders
Ipswich Town F.C. players
Woking F.C. players
Boston United F.C. players
St Albans City F.C. players
Bishop's Stortford F.C. players
Cambridge City F.C. players
King's Lynn Town F.C. players
Newmarket Town F.C. players
National League (English football) players
Southern Football League players